Scopula dimoera is a moth of the family Geometridae. It was described by  Prout in 1922. It is found in southern India.

References

Moths described in 1922
Moths of Asia
dimoera
Taxa named by Louis Beethoven Prout